Dinton Pastures Country Park is a country park in the civil parish of St Nicholas Hurst, in the borough of Wokingham, near Reading in the English county of Berkshire.

Geography and site

It has seven lakes, two rivers, three public bird hides, and meadows. One of the lakes, Lavells Lake is designated as a local nature reserve. The two rivers that flow through the park are the River Loddon and the Emm Brook. The Museum of Berkshire Aviation and the headquarters of the British Entomological and Natural History Society are both located in the park.

The site is popular for a number of sports including sailing, angling, kayaking, canoeing, and running, playing host to a parkrun. Other facilities include play areas and a cafe.

History

Anglo Saxons farmed the park's river meadows and called the area Whistley, where "wisc" means marshy meadows and "lei" means a woodland clearing.
From the start of the 17th century, much of the area then belonged to Windsor Forest.

The present day cafe was originally a farmhouse built in 1904, which was called 'High Chimneys'. In 1924 the area was sold to a farmer who renamed the farm after his home village of Dinton, near Aylesbury.

The country park is part of the river Loddon's flood plain and so makes a good source of gravel, between 1969 and 1979 an extensive gravel extraction program was carried out. Much of the gravel was used for  the M4 and the A329(M).

In 1979 Dinton Pastures was opened to the public. In 1992, part of the country park, Lavells Lake, was declared as a local nature reserve by Wokingham Borough Council.

Fauna
The site has the following fauna:

Mammals
Soprano pipistrelle
Common pipistrelle
Daubenton's bat
Brown long-eared bat
European rabbit
Red fox
Roe deer
Muntjac deer
Stoat
Weasel
Wood mouse
Eastern grey squirrel
Field vole
Mink

Invertebrates

Birds

Amphibians and reptiles
Common frog
Grass snake
Common toad
Smooth newt
Great crested newt
Red-eared slider

Fish
Common rudd
Common roach
Tench
Common bream
Northern pike
Common barbel
European chub
Common carp
European perch
Three-spined stickleback

Flora
The site has the following flora:

Trees
Betula pendula
Prunus spinosa
Quercus robur

Plants

Impatiens glandulifera
Leucojum aestivum
Ulex europaeus
Anthriscus sylvestris
Dipsacus
Primula veris
Phragmites communis
Inula helenium

References

External links
 
 Wokingham Borough Council: Dinton Pastures Country Park
 Photo gallery featuring Dinton Pastures Carp

Country parks in Berkshire